The Pacific-10 Conference football season in 1993 ended in a three-way tie for first place between the UCLA Bruins, USC Trojans, and Arizona Wildcats. UCLA won 27–21 over their crosstown rival, USC, to earn the conference's bid to the 1994 Rose Bowl.

Awards and honors

Conference awards
The following individuals won the conference's annual player and coach awards:
Offensive Player of the Year: J. J. Stokes, SE, UCLA
Defensive Player of the Year: Rob Waldrop, NG, Arizona
Coach of the Year: Terry Donahue, UCLA

All-Conference teams

The following players earned All-Pac-10 honors:
Offense

Defense

References

External links
1993 Pacific-10 Conference Year Summary at Sports-Reference.com